Baude is a surname. Notable people with the surname include:

Anna-Lisa Baude (1897–1968), Swedish film actress
Christian Baude (born 1982), German luger 
Dawn-Michelle Baude (born 1959), American poet, journalist and educator
Frank Baude (1936–2021), Swedish politician and bricklayer
Marcel Baude (born 1989), German footballer 
William Baude, American legal scholar